Visitors on the Icy Mountain is a 1963 Chinese film directed by Zhao Xinshui to a script by Bai Xin. The film is famous for its songs such as "Why Are the Flowers So Red", featuring the rawap and music of the Tajiks of Xinjiang.  The cast features Bai Dezhang, En Hesen, and Gu Yuying.

References

1963 films
Chinese-language films
Films adapted into operas
Films set in Xinjiang